ATMA Classique is a Canadian record label based in Montreal, Quebec. Founded in 1994 by Johanne Goyette, the company has close to 600 titles in its catalogue and distributes in over 25 countries and on the internet. Several recordings released by the company have won Juno and Felix Awards.

References

External links
ATMA Classique Official Website

Canadian independent record labels
Record labels established in 1995